Chantal Molenkamp (born 11 November 1990) is a retired Dutch Paralympic swimmer who competed in international level events. She competed at the 2012 and 2016 Summer Paralympics. She was diagnosed with mixed connective tissue disease when she was fifteen years old.

References

1990 births
Living people
Sportspeople from Alkmaar
Paralympic swimmers of the Netherlands
Dutch female freestyle swimmers
Swimmers at the 2012 Summer Paralympics
Swimmers at the 2016 Summer Paralympics
S10-classified Paralympic swimmers
21st-century Dutch women